Georgia State Route 6 Spur may refer to:

 Georgia State Route 6 Spur (Austell): a spur route of State Route 6 that exists in Austell
 Georgia State Route 6 Spur (Dallas): a former spur route of State Route 6 that existed in Dallas

006 Spur